is a former Japanese football player. He played for Japan national team.

Club career
Ueno was born in Saitama on April 21, 1973. After dropped out from Waseda University, he joined Yokohama Marinos (later Yokohama F. Marinos) in 1994. Initially, he played as offensive midfielder. In 1997, he was converted to defensive midfielder and became a regular player. The club won the champions 2001 J.League Cup, 2003 and 2004 J1 League. He retired end of 2007 season.

National team career
On June 6, 2000, Ueno debuted for Japan national team against Jamaica.

Club statistics

National team statistics

J1 League Firsts
 Appearance: April 27, 1994. Yokohama Marinos 1 vs 2 Bellmare Hiratsuka, Mitsuzawa Stadium
 Goal: September 21, 1994. Yokohama Marinos 1 vs 2 Bellmare Hiratsuka, Mitsuzawa Stadium

References

External links
 
 
 Japan National Football Team Database

1973 births
Living people
Waseda University alumni
Association football people from Saitama Prefecture
Japanese footballers
Japan international footballers
J1 League players
Yokohama F. Marinos players
Association football midfielders